The GiMA Best Music Director is given by Global Indian Music Academy as a part of its annual Global Indian Music Academy Awards.

List of winners
 2010 Vishal Bhardwaj – Kaminey
 2011 Sajid–Wajid, Lalit Pandit – Dabangg'
 Pritam – Once Upon A Time In Mumbaai
 Salim–Sulaiman – Band Baaja Baaraat
 Sanjay Leela Bhansali – Guzaarish
 Vishal–Shekhar – Anjaana Anjaani
 Wayne Sharpe, Shantanu Moitra, Aadesh Shrivastava, Pritam – Raajneeti
 2012 A.R. Rahman – Rockstar'
 Ajay–Atul – Agneepath
 Ram Sampath – Delhi Belly
 Shankar–Ehsaan–Loy – Zindagi Na Milegi Dobara
 Vishal–Shekhar – Ra.One
 2013 – (no award given)
 2014 Pritam – Yeh Jawaani Hai Deewani'
 Ankit Tiwari, Jeet Gannguli and Mithoon – Aashiqui 2
 Amit Trivedi – Lootera
 Shankar–Ehsaan–Loy – Bhaag Milkha Bhaag
 Sanjay Leela Bhansali – Goliyon Ki Raasleela Ram-Leela
 2015 Amit Trivedi – Queen
 A. R. Rahman – Highway
 Ankit Tiwari, Mithoon, Soch – Ek Villain
 Sachin–Jigar, Sharib–Toshi – Humpty Sharma Ki Dulhania
 Shankar–Ehsaan–Loy – 2 States
 Vishal–Shekhar – Bang Bang!
 2016 Sanjay Leela Bhansali – Bajirao Mastani
 Pritam – Bajrangi Bhaijaan
 A. R. Rahman – Tamasha
 Amaal Mallik, Ankit Tiwari, Meet Bros Anjjan – Roy
 Pritam – Dilwale
 Shankar–Ehsaan–Loy – Dil Dhadakne Do

See also
 Bollywood
 Cinema of India

References

Global Indian Music Academy Awards